Baetica ustulata is the only species of bush crickets in the monotypic genus Baetica (tribe Ephippigerini). 

It is endemic to Spain. The species feeds on plants, decaying organic matter, and others of its own species.

References

Tettigoniidae
Endemic insects of the Iberian Peninsula
Endemic fauna of Spain
Insects described in 1839
Orthoptera of Europe
Taxonomy articles created by Polbot